This is a list of Black British artists, born in or associated with the UK, who are notable in visual arts as designers, painters, photographers and sculptors.

A
 Faisal Abdu'Allah (born 1969)
 Kesewa Aboah (born 1994)
 Larry Achiampong (born 1984)
 Brenda Agard (1961–2012)
 Ajamu X (born 1963)
 John Akomfrah (born 1957)
 Pearl Alcock (1934–2006)
 Hurvin Anderson (born 1965)
 Eugene Ankomah (living)

B
 Chris Baker (born 1960)
 Black Audio Film Collective
 Hannah Black (living)
 BLK Art Group
 Frank Bowling (born 1934)
 Sonia Boyce (born 1962)
 Winston Branch (born 1947)
 Vanley Burke (born 1951)

C
 Pogus Caesar (born 1953)
 Sokari Douglas Camp (born 1958)
 Eddie Chambers (born 1960)
 Chinwe Chukwuogo-Roy (1952−2012)
 Quilla Constance (living)

D
 Adelaide Damoah (living)
 Paul Dash (born 1946)
 Dels (living)
 Godfried Donkor (born 1964)
 Kimathi Donkor (born 1965)

E
 Uzo Egonu (1931–1996)
 Ben Enwonwu (1917–1994)
 Kodwo Eshun (born 1967)
 Mary Evans (born 1963)

F
 Rotimi Fani-Kayode (1955–1989)
 Denzil Forrester (born 1956)
 Errol Francis (born 1956)

G
 Raimi Gbadamosi (born 1965)
 Goldie (born 1965)
 Joy Gregory (born 1959)

H
 Anthea Hamilton (born 1978)
 Lubaina Himid (born 1954)
 Zita Holbourne (born 1960s)

 Christian Holder (born 1949)
 Amanda Holiday (born 1964)

J
 Valda Jackson (born c. 1959)
 Emmanuel Taiwo Jegede (born 1943)
 Claudette Johnson (born 1959)
 Rachel Jones (born 1991)
 Tam Joseph (born 1947)
 Isaac Julien (born 1960)

K
 Samson Kambalu (born 1975)
 Rita Keegan (born 1949)
 Fowokan George Kelly (born 1943)

L
 Errol Lloyd (born 1943)
 Donald Locke (1930–2010)
 Hew Locke (born 1959)
 John Lyons (born 1933)

M
 Michael McMillan (born 1962)
 Althea McNish (1924–2020)
 Steve McQueen (born 1969)
 Kobena Mercer (born 1960)
 Jade Montserrat (born 1981)
 Ronald Moody (1900–1984)

N
 Virginia Nimarkoh (born 1967)
 David Emmanuel Noel (born 1972)
 Pitika Ntuli (born 1942)

O
 Magdalene Odundo (born 1950)
 Chris Ofili (born 1968)
 Kelvin Okafor (born 1985)
 Horace Ové (born 1939)
 Zak Ové (born 1966)

P
 Eugene Palmer (born 1955)
 Janette Parris (born 1962)
 Rudi Patterson (1933–2013)
 Woodrow Phoenix (living)
 Keith Piper (born 1960)
 Ingrid Pollard (born 1953)

R
 Benji Reid (born 1966)
 Donald Rodney (1961–1998)
 Veronica Ryan (born 1956)

S
 Ibrahim el-Salahi (born 1930)
 Michael Salu (living)
 Yinka Shonibare (born 1962)
 Maud Sulter (1960–2008)

V
 Lina Iris Viktor (born 1987)

W
 Barbara Walker (born 1964)
 Alberta Whittle (born 1980)
 Willard Wigan (born 1957)
 Aubrey Williams (1926–1990)
 Stephen Wiltshire (born 1974)

Y
 Lynette Yiadom-Boakye (born 1977)

See also
 Black British

Black British
Black British
British artists
List of Black Britih artists
Black